The Pocket Players' Guide is a book about Magic: The Gathering published by Wizards of the Coast.

Contents
The Pocket Players' Guide is made up of an expanded discussion of the rules of the game, including many examples and comments, followed by a glossary, then sections on developing decks, multiplayer games, tournament rules, and a complete guide to all the cards in the current edition and notes on any previous cards that now behave differently under the revised version of the rules.

Reception
Andy Butcher reviewed the fourth edition of The Pocket Players' Guide for Arcane magazine, rating it a 9 out of 10 overall. Butcher comments that "For the price of a starter deck, you can't really afford to be without this book, and it serves as a very good example of what a CCG players' guide should be."

Reviews
Dragon #227

References

Books about collectible card games
Magic: The Gathering publications